Sigma Sculptoris, Latinized from σ Sculptoris, is a solitary, white-hued  star in the southern constellation of Sculptor. It is faintly visible to the naked eye with an apparent visual magnitude of +5.54. Based upon an annual parallax shift of 14.04 mas as seen from Earth, it is located about 232 light years from the Sun.

This is an A-type subgiant with a stellar classification of A1/A2 IV. It is a suspected Ap star and is classified as an Alpha2 Canum Venaticorum variable with a periodicity of 2.37 days. The star has an estimated 2.07 the mass of the Sun and around 2.2 times the Sun's radius. It is spinning with a projected rotational velocity of 82 km/s and is about 464 million years old. Sigma Sculptoris radiates 25.7 times the solar luminosity from its photosphere at an effective temperature of 9005 K.

References

A-type subgiants
Alpha2 Canum Venaticorum variables
Sculptoris, Sigma
Sculptor (constellation)
Durchmusterung objects
006178
004852
0293
Ap stars